David Arthur Boulter (born 5 October 1962) is an English, retired professional footballer who played as a full back and made 16 appearances in the Football League for Crystal Palace.

Playing career
Boulter was born in Stepney, Greater London. He began his youth career at Crystal Palace and signed professional terms in 1981. In the summer of 1981 he had a two-month loan spell with Finnish second division side Myllykosken Pallo -47. Boulter made his Palace debut on 21 November 1981 in a 0–0 draw away to Oldham Athletic, and between then and the end of March 1982 missed only one league or cup game. However, he then lost his  place as Paul Hinshelwood and Steve Lovell became the regular full-backs, and at the end of the season, he moved on to non-league football with Crawley Town.

References

External links
Crystal Palace players page at neilbrowm.com
David Boulter at holmesdale.net

1962 births
Living people
Footballers from Stepney
English footballers
English expatriate footballers
English Football League players
Expatriate footballers in Finland
Association football defenders
Crystal Palace F.C. players
Crawley Town F.C. players
Enfield F.C. players
National League (English football) players